The 2021 Street Skateboarding World Championships took place in Rome, Italy, from 30 May to 6 June 2021. The event was organised by Sport e Salute and World Skate.

The event contributed towards qualification for the 2020 Olympics in Tokyo, where skateboarding made its debut as an Olympic sport. The three medallists in both the men's and women's events qualified automatically for the Olympics.

Medal summary

Medal table

Medallists

References

External links

World Skate

World Skateboarding Championships
Street Skateboarding World Championships
Street Skateboarding World Championships
Street Skateboarding World Championships
Street Skateboarding World Championships
International sports competitions hosted by Italy
Sports competitions in Rome